XEZJ-AM is a radio station on 1480 AM in Guadalajara, Jalisco, Mexico. It is owned by Grupo Radiorama and carries a pop rock music radio format known as Rock and Pop.

History
XEZJ-AM received its concession on June 20, 1962. It was owned by Julio Romo Valdivia and based in Zapopan, with 250 watts of power. Carlos Fregoso Mendoza bought XEZJ in 1966, and power increased to 500 and later 1,000 watts. XEZJ-AM was known as Radio Selecciones in the late 1970s and early 1980s, Zona Juvenil in the 1980s, 14-80 in the late 1990s, sports-formatted Solo Fútbol from 2003–06, and carried Radio Trece programs from 2006 to 2008.

Until 2006, XEZJ-AM broadcast from the Federalismo Norte AM transmitter used by XEBON-AM 1280.

In 2016, XEZJ-AM flipped from news/talk format "Ciudad 1480" to a motivational talk format known as "Simplemente Supérate", but in 2019, the station returned to the "1480" moniker. On February 15, 2021, the station changed names again, this time to "Rock and Pop".

References

1962 establishments in Mexico
Radio stations established in 1962
Radio stations in Guadalajara
Spanish-language radio stations